Fort Van Meter, or Fort VanMeter or Van Meter Fort, may refer to any of several 18th century frontier forts built in the eastern United States by members of the pioneering Dutch-American Van Meter family:

Fort Van Meter (Hampshire County, West Virginia) (ca. 1754), built by Henry Van Meter (1718-1778)
Fort Van Meter (1756), former name of Fort Pleasant, Hardy County, West Virginia (built by Isaac Van Meter (1692-1757))
Fort Van Meter (1774), Short Creek, Ohio County, West Virginia
Fort Van Meter (1770s), Muddy Creek, Greene County, Pennsylvania (built by Jacob Van Meter, Sr (1722-1798))
Fort Van Meter (1770s), Swan's Run, Greene County, Pennsylvania (built by Henry Van Meter)
Van Meter Fort (1780), Hardin County, Kentucky (built by Jacob Van Meter, Sr)